Daniil Pavlovich Petrunin (born 10 June 1999) is a Russian football player. He plays for FC Shinnik Yaroslavl.

Club career
He made his debut in the Russian Football National League for FC Spartak-2 Moscow on 17 July 2018 in a game against PFC Sochi.

He made his debut for the main squad of FC Spartak Moscow on 21 October 2020 in a Russian Cup game against FC Yenisey Krasnoyarsk.

References

External links
 
 
 Profile by Russian Football National League

1999 births
Sportspeople from Tolyatti
Living people
Russian footballers
Russia youth international footballers
Association football defenders
FC Spartak Moscow players
FC Spartak-2 Moscow players
FC Shinnik Yaroslavl players
Russian First League players